"My Chopped Liver" is the 17th episode of season five and the 110th episode of the American situation comedy Scrubs. It originally aired on April 4, 2006 on NBC.

Overview
J.D. hangs out with Turk on one of his rare nights off, resulting in Turk getting behind in his work and getting in trouble with Dr. Wen. The two treat a patient with jaundice who needs a liver transplant from his brother. Unexpectedly, the donor nearly dies when one of his sutures comes undone and he must be rushed to the operating room.

Jordan and Elliot double date with their significant others, Dr. Cox and Keith.

Dr. Kelso's dog Baxter died and he can't help but cry. Determined to hide this side of him from the hospital staff, he enlists Carla to act as a middle man and intercept anyone who needs to see him.

Responses
The episode's storyline regarding a liver transplant led to a nomination at The Sentinel for Health Awards in 2006 in the primetime comedy section.

References

External links
 

Scrubs (season 5) episodes
2006 American television episodes